Gilles Carle,  (July 31, 1928 – November 28, 2009) was a French Canadian director, screenwriter and painter.

Gilles Carle, who was a key figure in the development of a commercial Quebec cinema, worked as a graphic artist and writer before he joined the National Film Board of Canada in 1960. His innovative debut feature, La Vie heureuse de Léopold Z., tracked the adventures of a snowplough operator during a madcap Christmas Eve. But after the NFB rejected several of his projects, he began working independently. In 1971 Carle joined forces with Pierre Lamy to form Les Productions Carle-Lamy, which produced Claude Jutra’s epic Kamouraska, Denys Arcand’s early features and all his early films. The quirkily paced, proto-feminist La Vraie Nature de Bernadette – widely regarded as his best film – and Le Mort d’un bûcheron eventually led to the more mainstream but graceful Les Plouffe and the epic love story Maria Chapdelaine, both classics of Quebec cinema. In 1972 Carle won the Canadian Film Award for best Director for his The True Nature of Bernadette.

Carle was born in Maniwaki, Quebec. His film 50 ans, celebrating the 50 years of the National Film Board of Canada, won the Short Film Palme d'Or at the 1989 Cannes Film Festival.

In 1990, he was awarded the Government of Quebec's Prix Albert-Tessier. In 1997, Carle received a Governor General's Performing Arts Award for Lifetime Artistic Achievement, Canada's highest honour in the performing arts. In 1998, he was made an Officer of the Order of Canada. In 2007, he was made a Grand Officer of the Ordre National du Quebec.

Carle died aged 81 on November 28, 2009, of complications from Parkinson's disease at the hospital in Granby, Quebec. His companion of 27 years was the actress and singer Chloé Sainte-Marie.  Quebec Premier Jean Charest described him, at his death, as one of Quebec's most influential filmmakers. He was entombed at the Notre Dame des Neiges Cemetery in Montreal.

Filmography

Feature films
Solange dans nos campagnes - 1964, short film (re-released as part of the 1964 anthology film Trois Femmes)
The Merry World of Leopold Z (La vie heureuse de Léopold Z) - 1965
The Rape of a Sweet Young Girl (Le Viol d'une jeune fille douce) - 1968
Red - 1970
The Men (Les mâles) - 1971
The True Nature of Bernadette (La vraie nature de Bernadette) - 1972
The Heavenly Bodies (Les Corps célestes) - 1973
The Death of a Lumberjack (La mort d'un bûcheron) - 1973
Normande (La tête de Normande St-Onge) - 1975
The Angel and the Woman (L'Ange et la femme) - 1977
The Machine Age (L'âge de la machine) - 1977, short film
Fantastica - 1980
The Plouffe Family (Les Plouffe) - 1981
Maria Chapdelaine - 1983
La guêpe (aka Scalp - 1986
The Postmistress (La postière) - 1992
The Other Side of the Law - 1994
Poor Man's Pudding (Pudding chômeur) - 1996

Documentaries
Dimanche d'Amérique (Short film, 1961)
Manger (Short film Co-Directed with Louis Portugais, 1961)
Patinoire (Short film, 1962)
Un air de famille (Short film, 1963)
Natation (Short film, 1963)
Patte mouillée (Short film, 1963)
Percé on the Rocks (Short film, 1964)
Place à Olivier Guimond (TV documentary, 1967)
Place aux Jérolas (TV documentary, 1967)
Le Québec à l'heure de l'Expo (Short film, 1967)
Stéréo (Short film, 1970)
Les chevaliers (1971)
Les chevaux ont-ils des ailes? (Short film, 1975)
Les masques (TV documentary aka Carle – masques, 1978)
Jouer sa vie (Co-Directed with Camille Coudari, 1982)
Cinéma, cinéma (Co-Directed with Werner Nold, 1985)
Ô Picasso (Co-Directed with Camille Coudari, 1985)
Vive Québec, cité française... ville francophone (1987)
50 ans (Short film, 1989)
Le diable d'amérique (1990)
Montréal off (Short film, 1991)
Moi, j'me fais mon cinéma (1999)

Television
Un hiver brûlant (TV episode of the series La feuille d'érable, 1971)
A Thousand Moons (TV movie, 1976) (Created for TV series For the Record)
Homecoming (TV movie aka Lonesome Riders, 1979)
Le Crime d'Ovide Plouffe (TV miniseries Parts 1–4, 1983) (Parts 5–6 directed by Denys Arcand)
Miss Moscou (TV movie, 1991)
L'honneur des grandes neiges (TV movie, 1994) (Created for TV series Aventures dans le Grand Nord)
Le sang du chasseur (TV movie, 1995) (Created for TV series Aventures dans le Grand Nord)
Épopée en Amérique: une histoire populaire du Québec (TV series, 1997)

References

Further reading
 Vincent Grondin, "Gilles Carle et l'impossible nature de Bernadette", Nouvelles Vues, issue 17, winter-spring 2016 : https://web.archive.org/web/20161102064959/http://www.nouvellesvues.ulaval.ca/no-17-hiver-2016-cinema-et-philosophie-par-s-santini-et-p-a-fradet/articles/gilles-carle-et-limpossible-nature-de-bernadette-par-vincent-grondin/ 
Carle, Gilles: Scénarios 1, Boreal 2005, 
Carle, Gilles: Scénarios 2, Boreal 2005, 
Coulombe, Michel :Gilles Carle le Chemin Secret du Cinema. Liber Canada, 2005,

External links 
 
 Watch films by Gilles Carle at the National Film Board of Canada
  Fonds Gilles Carle (R4308) at Library and Archives Canada

1928 births
2009 deaths
Canadian screenwriters in French
Film directors from Quebec
Deaths from Parkinson's disease
French Quebecers
Best Screenplay Genie and Canadian Screen Award winners
Grand Officers of the National Order of Quebec
Officers of the Order of Canada
National Film Board of Canada people
Governor General's Performing Arts Award winners
Best Director Genie and Canadian Screen Award winners
Prix Albert-Tessier winners
Burials at Notre Dame des Neiges Cemetery
20th-century Canadian screenwriters
People from Maniwaki